E. T. Slattery was a clothing store in downtown Boston in the 19th and 20th centuries. It was a high-end store offering women's, children's, and men's apparel and accessories.

The store was founded by Ellen T. Slattery in 1867, Slattery being a female entrepreneur, which was somewhat unusual for the time. It was first located on Hayward Place off Washington Street, then moved to 631 Tremont Street, then Boylston Street, then 84 Beacon Street, then 156 Tremont Street across from the Boston Common in 1901, where it remained until it closed in 1957.

In 1908, Boston retail veteran P. A. O'Connell, recently a co-proprietor of the Magrane Houston department store, became the company's long-term president.

In 1913 the store expanded in 158 Tremont Street, taking all five floors of that building. By the 1930s Slattery's occupied three entire adjoining buildings.

A branch was established in summer of 1916 in Magnolia, Massachusetts, on Cape Ann, in a purpose-built building at Lexington and Hesperus Avenues, for the summer resort trade. P. A. O'Connell believed in growing the business with branches, and Slattery’s opened a branch in the wealthy suburb of Wellesley in the early 1920s, and another branch in Coolidge Corner in Brookline in April 1927. The Wellesley branch moved to a new, larger site in November 1940, and the company continued to thrive through the 1940s. 

However, the company entered a decline in the 1950s, as did many urban stores due to loss of custom to suburban malls. The Brookline branch, suffering from high rent and lack of public parking, was closed in January 1957. The company ceased business altogether in June 1957. The buildings were later demolished and the Tremont on the Common high-rise apartment building constructed on the site in 1968.

References

External links

1867 establishments in Massachusetts
1957 disestablishments in Massachusetts
Defunct clothing retailers of the United States
Defunct department stores based in Massachusetts